The Victoria Bug Zoo is a two-room minizoo that is located in downtown Victoria, British Columbia, Canada, just one block north of the Fairmont Empress Hotel. It was sold to Xing Chen in 2014. The Victoria Bug Zoo is run by General Manager Jaymie Chudiak and Outreach Manager Karlee Friesen.

Features
The Bug Zoo exhibits about 50 species of insects, arachnids, and other arthropods and is currently the largest tropical insect collection in North America. It displays Canada's largest ant farm that contains leaf-cutter ants. It hosts diverse and changing exhibits of various arthropod species, allowing visitors to see and interact with animals they may never encounter in the wild. A main focus of the Victoria Bug Zoo is to help people overcome their fears of insects and arachnids in a safe, engaging and informative environment.

Visitors can explore the zoo at their own leisure, or follow a guided tour for a hands-on and educational experience.  While with a tour guide, visitors can hold and touch a variety of terrestrial arthropods such as tarantulas, cockroaches, scorpions, walking sticks, millipedes, and some praying mantis species.

References

External links
Official website

Zoos in British Columbia
Tourist attractions in Victoria, British Columbia
Culture of Victoria, British Columbia
Buildings and structures in Victoria, British Columbia
Insectariums